Clark G. Gilbert (born June 18, 1970) has been a general authority seventy of the Church of Jesus Christ of Latter-day Saints (LDS Church) since April 2021 and the Church Commissioner of Education since August of that year. He was the president of BYU–Pathway Worldwide (BYU–PW), an online higher education organization, from its creation in 2017 until August 2021. He was serving as the 16th president of Brigham Young University–Idaho (BYU–Idaho) when he was appointed inaugural president of BYU–PW.  Previously, Gilbert served as president and CEO of both the Deseret News and Deseret Digital Media, having also served as an executive vice president of Deseret Management Corporation, a professor at Harvard Business School (HBS), and as an associate academic vice president at BYU–Idaho.

Career
Gilbert was a professor of entrepreneurial management at HBS. While there he was an adviser to the American Press Institute's Newspaper Next project, which studied ways for newspapers to transition to the digital age. Gilbert also worked closely with Clayton M. Christensen while at HBS.

After his time at HBS, Gilbert joined the faculty of BYU–Idaho and served as Associate Academic Vice President of Academic Development; his responsibilities included student leadership, the BYU–Idaho Learning Model, online learning, and the Pathway program.

Deseret Digital Media and Deseret News
In 2009, Gilbert became the CEO of the newly formed Deseret Digital Media, a subsidiary corporation of Deseret Management Corporation, which administers the websites of the Deseret News, Church News, Mormon Times, KSL radio and Deseret Book.

In May 2010, Gilbert was appointed president of the Deseret News. He did not replace Jim Wall (the publisher) or Joseph A. Cannon (the editor), but filled a new role in the organization.

In August 2010, with Gilbert at the helm, the Deseret News laid off 43 percent of its workforce.

Gilbert unveiled a set of six themes to guide the paper's coverage—previously distinguished by its lack of oversight from its owner, the LDS Church, and a strict devotion to impartiality—going forward: 1. The Family, 2. Financial Responsibility, 3. Excellence in Education, 4. Care for the Needy, 5. Values in Media, and 6. Faith in the Community.

Using his theory of "disruption" economics, Gilbert has tried to pinpoint the cost of each story and achieve a more cost-effective story output. In February 2011, Gilbert was the keynote speaker at a conference in St. Petersburg, Florida, where Borrell Associates CEO Gordon Borrell named him the "Innovator of the Year." Gilbert has also spoken to regional newspapers and editors about ways to better monetize journalism.

Under Gilbert, the Deseret News has reported a boost in all aspects of its circulation, but some of its numbers have been disproved by The Salt Lake Tribune and Salt Lake City Weekly.

As part of Gilbert's plan to "lead and innovate," the Deseret News and KSL created Deseret Connect, a network of freelance contributors under the direction of Matt Sanders. Much of Deseret Connect's content has been featured prominently on the Deseret News homepage, though the print paper has largely remained the work of full- and part-time staff.

In November 2011, it was revealed that the mayor of Utah's West Valley City, Michael K. Winder, wrote under a pen name as a Deseret Connect contributor about city hall events, and that his stories were featured in the Deseret News. Gilbert said he was "concerned" that somebody would misrepresent himself in such a way.

BYU–Idaho
On April 13, 2015, Gilbert succeeded Kim B. Clark as president of BYU–Idaho, becoming the institution's 16th president.  His appointment had been announced on January 27, 2015, by Russell M. Nelson, then chairman of the Executive Committee of the BYU–Idaho Board of Trustees.  Gilbert was formally installed during an inauguration ceremony on September 15, 2015.

BYU–PW
On February 7, 2017, Dieter F. Uchtdorf announced the creation of BYU–PW, a new online higher education organization.  Gilbert was appointed to head this new organization, which grew out of BYU–Idaho's Pathway program, originally started in 2009.  He was replaced as president of BYU–Idaho by Henry J. Eyring, with his new position as president of BYU–PW effective on May 1, 2017.

Personal life
Gilbert and his wife, Christine, are the parents of eight children. Gilbert served as an LDS Church missionary in Kobe, Japan, from 1989 to 1991.

Gilbert earned a bachelor's degree in International Relations from Brigham Young University in Provo, Utah, a master's degree in East Asian Studies from Stanford University and a Doctor of Business Administration from HBS.

Gilbert has served previously in the LDS Church as a bishop, member of a stake presidency, and as an area seventy from April 2020 to April 2021. In April 2021, Gilbert was called as an LDS Church general authority.

External links

References

Deseret News people
American business executives
Brigham Young University alumni
Brigham Young University–Idaho faculty
Harvard Business School alumni
Harvard Business School faculty
Living people
Stanford University alumni
20th-century Mormon missionaries
1970 births
American Mormon missionaries in Japan
Latter Day Saints from California
Latter Day Saints from Idaho
Latter Day Saints from Massachusetts
Latter Day Saints from Utah
General authority seventies (LDS Church)
American general authorities (LDS Church)